Cowlinge, pronounced "Coolinje", is a village and civil parish in the West Suffolk district of Suffolk in eastern England close to the Cambridgeshire and Essex borders.

Village name 
Over the years it has been known by many names:

Culinge - 11th century.
Culinges - 1195.
Cooling - David Elisha Davy in the early 19th century.

The name probably means the home or settlement of Culs or Cula's people.

The village 
Cowlinge village encompasses a large area of countryside and the local parish stretches some three miles (5 km) from its northern border with Lidgate to its southern border near HMP Highpoint, formerly Stradishall airfield. Its north-west border is the county boundary between Suffolk and the parish of Kirtling in Cambridgeshire. At this end of the parish is the  estate of Branches Park, which was laid out by Lancelot "Capability" Brown. The great mansion, which was the home of the Dickins, Usborne and other families has unfortunately been demolished but has been replaced by three large residences.

The oldest building in the village is the mediaeval Church of St. Margaret of Antioch.  This lovely building was built approximately 650 years ago and is still in regular use for Christian worship. The building has evolved over the years and is the product of a great deal of love and care which people of many periods and traditions have lavished upon it.

The 19th century former village school is now a private residence.

At the centre of the village is the Freehouse - Public House The Three Ways currently owned and run by Sue and Chris Smith.

Another prominent feature in the village is the WWI Memorial situated at Tillbrooks Hill and bordering Queen Street.

Village publications 
The Cowlinge Chronicle is a free, quarterly publication produced for the benefit of residents, past and present. It is kindly produced on an entirely voluntary basis to an extremely high standard. Much acclaim has come its way in recent years from many sources with regard to, amongst other things, its interesting and often amusing content, lay-out and graphics and sheer professionalism.
The editor, Christina Robson, can be contacted on: editor.chronicle@cowlinge.suffolk.gov.uk

Cowlinge in the news 
1839-1840 Bury and Norwich Post newspaper archive

Tourism 
 National Horse-racing Museum & Tours 7 Miles
 Ickworth House, Park & Garden 7 Miles
 Newmarket Racecourses 8 Miles

Notes

External links 

 Church Of Saint Margaret's Cowlinge
 Cowlinge Parish Council
 St Edmundsbury Borough Council
 Cowlinge War Memorial

Villages in Suffolk
Civil parishes in Suffolk
Borough of St Edmundsbury